Chicoutimi is a borough in Quebec.

Chicoutimi  may also refer to:

 Chicoutimi—Le Fjord, federal electoral district
 Chicoutimi—Saguenay, federal electoral district
 Chicoutimi (provincial electoral district)
 HMCS Chicoutimi, the name of several Canadian naval units